Thomas Edward Herrin (September 12, 1929 – November 29, 1999) was a relief pitcher in Major League Baseball who played briefly for the Boston Red Sox during the 1954 season. He played college baseball and basketball at Louisiana Tech University. He was born in Shreveport, Louisiana.

Herrin posted a 1–2 record with a 7.31 ERA in 14 appearances, including eight strikeouts, 22 walks, and 28⅓ innings of work. He  was not credited with a save.

Herrin died in Homer, Louisiana, at age 70.

Sources
Baseball Reference

1929 births
1999 deaths
Baltimore Orioles (IL) players
Baseball players from Shreveport, Louisiana
Boston Red Sox players
Louisiana Tech Bulldogs baseball players
Louisiana Tech Bulldogs basketball players
Louisville Colonels (minor league) players
Major League Baseball pitchers
Oneonta Red Sox players
San Jose Red Sox players
Scranton Miners players